Jayaram K R is an Indian politician. He is a member of the All India Anna Dravida Munnetra Kazhagam party. His full name is Kaliappa Gounder Rangaswamy Jayaram . He was Born in the city of Coimbatore, Manchester of south India. He was bought up in a joint Family culture in traditional Kongu nadu style. His parents were Rangaswamy Gounder and Lakshmi, both of them hailing from Agriculture family. Right from childhood, K R Jayaram was an intelligent, smart, flamboyant and charming person who had a great inclination towards serving the society and had been helping number of people in whatever way he could. . He was elected as a member of Tamil Nadu Legislative Assembly from Singanallur Constituency in May 2021. He secured 81000 votes to win the assembly constituency.  His past duties to the citizens include the following

Chairman,  Coimbatore  Corporation,  East Zone (2011-2016)

Chairman ,  Sarkar Samakulam Union (2006-2011).

He is the incumbent  head of Coimbatore  Urban Region MGR youth wing, a subordinate wing of AIADMK.(ALL INDIA ANNA DRAVIDA MUNNETRA KAZHAGAM) founded by Puratchi Thalaivar MGR.

References 

People from Tamil Nadu
Living people
Tamil Nadu politicians
All India Anna Dravida Munnetra Kazhagam politicians
Tamil Nadu MLAs 2021–2026
Year of birth missing (living people)